Rajghat Power Station is located at NCT Delhi. The power plant is one of the coal based power plants of IPGCL

Power plant
Rajghat Thermal Power Station has an installed capacity of 135 MW. The First unit was commissioned during 1989–90. Later the second unit was added. This power plant is one of two coal-fired power plants that was by IPGCL, the other being Indraprastha power station which was closed due to ageing.
The water source for the plant is from Yamuna river.
The Coal source for the plant is from NCL and BINA mines.

Installed capacity

See also 

Pragati Power Station
IPGCL Gas Turbine Power Station

References 

Coal-fired power stations in Delhi
Government buildings in Delhi
1989 establishments in Delhi
Energy infrastructure completed in 1989
20th-century architecture in India